Dick Walters (born 1946/1947) is an American former college basketball coach.  He coached the Evansville Purple Aces men's basketball team from 1978 to 1985.  Walters was hired after the entire 1977–78 Evansville team perished in a plane crash during the season in December 1977.

Walters is a graduate of Illinois State University and achieved a record of 202–56 in the junior college ranks at the College of DuPage prior to accepting the Evansville Purple Aces men's basketball job.

Following the Purple Aces NCAA appearance in 1982, Walters interviewed for the University of Wisconsin–Madison head coaching position but chose to remain at Evansville with a new five-year contract.

Head coaching record

College

References

Year of birth missing (living people)
1940s births
Living people
American men's basketball coaches
Evansville Purple Aces men's basketball coaches
Illinois State University alumni
Junior college men's basketball coaches in the United States